The Minister of the Interior was the member of the Canadian Cabinet who oversaw the Department of the Interior, which was responsible for federal land management, immigration, Indian affairs, and natural-resources extraction.

The position was created in 1873 by Statute 36 Victoria, c. 4, to replace the Secretary of State for the Provinces. The Act designated the Minister as ex officio the Superintendent-General of Indian Affairs. From 30 March 1912 to 9 February 1913, and from 31 December 1919 to 6 August 1930, the Minister of the Interior was also designated ex officio the Minister of Mines.

In 1917 the responsibility for passports was transferred over to the Minister of Immigration and Colonization.

It was superseded in 1936 by the Minister responsible for Indian Affairs and Minister of Mines and Resources.

Ministers
Key:

See also
 Secretary of State for the Provinces - post preceding the Minister of Interior
 Secretary of State for Canada

References

External links
 

Canada
Interior
Interior